Oak Island is the fourth EP by New Hampshire-based post-hardcore band Our Last Night. It was self-released on November 4, 2013, and was the band's first original release after leaving Epitaph Records.

Background 
Oak Island is Our Last Night's first original release after leaving Epitaph Records. The EP is named after a real island in Nova Scotia that is known for a legend about buried treasure and multiple discoveries of mysterious objects.

Recording 
The band recorded the album at Sonic Debris Recording and Impact Studios. The funds for this EP and their other EP A Summer of Covers were raised through a Indiegogo campaign where they had a goal of $15,000 and raised $46,551.

Promotion 
On October 22, 2013, a music video was released on Spotify and YouTube for the single "Same Old War". A lyric video for "I've Never Felt This Way" was released on YouTube on November 1, 2013. The EP was released on November 4, 2013. On January 7, 2014, a music video was released for "Sunrise" where the band partnered with the Bully Project to create a collaboration t-shirt with all the money earned from the t-shirt donated to the Bully Project. A tour was announced to start on February 3, 2014, with Secrets and Empires Fade. The band released a music video for "Dark Storms" on April 29, 2014. An acoustic version of the EP was released June 25, 2014.

Reception 

Sputnikmusic described the EP as "a rare example of how to make a simple and catchy album without sacrificing a moment of creativity" and that it was "a standout for the lighter side of the genre".

Track listing

Credits and personnel 

Our Last Night
 Trevor Wentworth – lead vocals, additional guitar
 Matt Wentworth – clean vocals, guitar
 Alex "Woody" Woodrow – bass
 Tim Molloy – drums

Production
 Matt Wentworth – producer, mixing engineer
 Dan Korneff – mixing engineer
 Stetson Whitworth – additional producer, programmer
 Corwin Bermudez – album artist

Charts

References 

2013 EPs
Our Last Night albums